Squash has been a sport of  the Pan American Games since the 1995 games.

Medal table

Men

Singles

Doubles

Team

Women

Singles

Doubles

Team

Mixed doubles

Events

See also
 Federation of Panamerica
 Pan American Squash Championships

External links
Sports123

 
Sports at the Pan American Games
Pan American Games
Pan American Games
Pan American Games